Unione Sportiva Dilettantistica Adriese 1906 is an Italian association football club, based in Adria, Veneto. The club was founded in 1906. Adriese currently plays in Serie D. The team's colors are dark red and blue. They played home games at the Stadio Luigi Bettinazzi stadium.

External links
Official homepage

Football clubs in Veneto
Association football clubs established in 1906
1906 establishments in Italy